Shumcho is an underdocumented Sino-Tibetan language spoken in Kinnaur district, Himachal Pradesh, India.

Shumcho speakers make up a majority of the population in the villages of Kanam, Labrang, Spillo, Shyaso, Rushkalang and Taling. They also reside in the mixed villages of Sunnam, Jangi, Lippa and Asrang where they belong to the lower Scheduled Caste. Upper-caste Scheduled Tribe dwellers of the same villages speak related but distinct languages, Sunam and Jangshung.

References

Bibliography

Languages of Himachal Pradesh
Kinnaur district
Endangered languages of India 
West Himalayish languages